Rodolfo Sancho Aguirre (born 14 January 1975) is a Spanish actor. He is best known for his role as Julián Martínez in the television series El Ministerio del Tiempo.

Personal life 
Sancho was born on 14 January 1975 in Madrid, Spain the son of actor Félix Sancho Gracia and Noela Aguirre.

In 1994, his son Daniel was born when he was 19 years old. In 2015, he welcomed a daughter, Jimena, with partner Xenia Tostado.

Career 
His first roles came in the 1990s in the television series Hermanos de leche, Carmen y familia, with small roles in other projects such as Muertos de risa and La comunidad. His first major role came portraying Nico in Al salir de clase for four years. In cinema, he worked alongside Javier Florrieta (Pacto de brujas), Sigfrid Monleón (La bicicleta) and with Jorge Sánchez-Cabezudo in his directorial debut, La noche de los girasoles.

In 2012, he returned to La 1 for Isabel, a series depicting the life of Isabel I of Castile, portraying Fernando II of Aragón for three seasons before departing for another La 1 series, El Ministerio del Tiempo playing the part of Julián Martínez, a nurse working for SAMUR where he was a series regular for Season 1 and had a recurring role in the second season.

His work on El Ministerio del Tiempo was delayed as he starred as the lead role in Antena 3's Mar de Plástico as Héctor.

Filmography

Film

Television

Stage
 Caos
 Misterio en el circo de irás y no volverás
 El cerco de Numancia
 Cedra
 Fedra

References

1975 births
Living people
Spanish male television actors
Spanish male film actors
Spanish male stage actors
20th-century Spanish male actors
21st-century Spanish male actors
Male actors from Madrid